Pensacola Bay is a bay located in the northwestern part of Florida, United States, known as the Florida Panhandle.

The bay, an inlet of the Gulf of Mexico, is located in Escambia County and Santa Rosa County, adjacent to the city of Pensacola, Florida, and is about 13 miles (21 km) long and 2.5 miles (4 km) wide.  The Pensacola Bay estuarine system, including Escambia Bay, Pensacola Bay, Blackwater Bay, East Bay, and Santa Rosa Sound, and four rivers — the Escambia, Blackwater, Yellow, and East Bay rivers — is 144 square miles, and it is the fourth largest estuarine system in Florida.

Pensacola Bay is formed and protected by Fairpoint Peninsula and the barrier island of Santa Rosa. The Pensacola Bay Bridge crosses the bay, connecting Pensacola to Gulf Breeze on the western end of the peninsula. The Gulf Islands National Seashore includes Santa Rosa Island, and encloses part of the bay. The Gulf Intracoastal Waterway runs through a section of the bay. Pensacola Bay leads into Escambia Bay to the north, and to the East Bay. Pensacola Pass connects the Bay to the Gulf of Mexico.

History 
After the War of 1812, the federal government decided to fortify Pensacola and Pensacola Bay. It built the Navy Yard west of the city in Warrington, starting in 1828 (this was redeveloped in the 20th century as Naval Air Station Pensacola). It completed construction of Fort Pickens in 1834 at the western end of Santa Rosa Island; completed Fort McRee in 1839, and completed redesign and expansion of Fort Barrancas in 1844, to add to defenses.

2010 Gulf oil spill
Following the Deepwater Horizon oil spill (called the "Gulf oil spill"), the government and BP planned to close the entrance to Pensacola Pass with a floating barrier system in June 2010, to control tidal flow of oil entering from the Gulf of Mexico. The daily high tide was causing oil-contaminated water to enter Pensacola Bay. Such a barrier system is designed to allow boats to travel through Pensacola Pass during the outflowing tide, but to close during the rising tide.

The booming plan was never carried out.  The Pass was only boomed for a day due to strong currents which broke the boom. No other plan was in place in areas of less current nor was there a plan to trap incoming oil. Oil product entered the pass.

See also
Pensacola, Florida
History of Pensacola, Florida

References
The Road Atlas '06, Rand McNally, pg. 27
NOAA Nautical Charts 11382, 11383, 11384

External links
Visit Pensacola Website

Bays of Florida on the Gulf of Mexico
Bodies of water of Escambia County, Florida
Bodies of water of Santa Rosa County, Florida
Navarre, Florida